Rose Seretse is the CEO of the Botswana Energy Regulatory Authority. She previously was the Director General of the Botswana Directorate on Corruption and Economic Crime from 2009 until 2017. She has represented Botswana internationally for anti-corruption initiatives.

Education 
Rose Seretse holds a Masters in Public Administration from the University of Botswana. She also holds a Bachelor of Construction Engineering and Management from Ferris State University in the United States.

Career 
She started her work as Senior Technical Officer at the Kgalagadi District Council and the Lobatse Town Council. She joined the Directorate on Corruption and Economic Crime in 1997 where she started working mainly at corruption prevention in the construction industry. She later moved to the public education division within the Directorate. Her role was to educate the public on evils of corruption and to get their support. She moved from education division to Human Resource and Administration division where she was responsible for the administration aspect of the Directorate. She was again moved to the division of performance improvement, or Performance Management System (PMS), where she coordinated Performance Improvement Activities of the Directorate on Corruption. She was appointed Deputy Director in 2007 and became Director General in 2009.

Seretse is a cousin by marriage to Ramadeluka Seretse, the cousin of former President Ian Khama. In 2017, Seretse was removed from her position as Director General at DCEC and transferred to the Botswana Energy Regulatory Authority (BERA). In 2018, she was given an award by Rt. Hon. Patricia Scotland QC, Commonwealth Secretary-General, on behalf of the Commonwealth Secretariat, for her work on the Commonwealth Africa Anti-Corruption Centre. In 2019, BERA was investigated for its financial practices, and the appointment of Sereste was also investigated.

Awards 
 Outstanding student Award – Ferris State University
 Sigma Lambda Chi
 Long service Good Conduct
 Certificate of Appreciation by the International Law Enforcement Academy
 Africa’ Most Influential Woman – CEO Global 2017
 Commonwealth Secretariat Recognition 2018
 Presidential Honour award on 29 September 2018

International presentation 
 Accountability in Government and Business – Washington, D.C.
 Fighting Corruption is a Journey – Oslo Norway
 Corruption Prevention in the Workplace – Shangai China
 Effective Tools for fighting Corruption – Sweden
 High Level Anti-Corruption Conference – Tanzania
 Various Panel discussions internationally

References

Living people
Year of birth missing (living people)
Government ministers of Botswana
Women government ministers of Botswana
21st-century Botswana women politicians
21st-century Botswana politicians